Yvonne Anuli Orji   (born 2 December 1983) is a Nigerian-American actress and comedian. She is best known for her role in the television series Insecure (2016–2021), for which she was nominated for a Primetime Emmy Award and three NAACP Image Awards.

Life and career
Orji was born on 2 December 1983, in Port Harcourt, Rivers State, Nigeria to Igbo parents, and she grew up in Laurel, Maryland, in the United States. She spent her high school years in the small town of Lititz, Pennsylvania, where she attended Linden Hall, the oldest all-girls boarding school in the country. Raised Catholic, Orji is now a devout Protestant and has stated that she will remain a virgin until marriage.

She earned her BA in liberal arts and a master's degree in public health at George Washington University as well. Orji's parents expected her to become a doctor, lawyer, pharmacist, or engineer. However, she was inspired to do comedy as a graduate student when she performed stand-up in the talent portion of a beauty pageant.

After graduate school, in 2009, Orji moved to New York City to pursue a career in comedy. In 2015, she landed the role of Molly on Insecure without an agent or any real acting experience. In 2021, she began development on a series for Disney+ titled First Gen. The series is based on her personal life and is produced by Oprah Winfrey and David Oyelowo. Orji is the author of the book Bamboozled by Jesus.

She gave a speech at TEDxWilmingtonSalon in 2017 titled, "The wait is sexy". In the talk, she explains her reasons for abstaining from sex before marriage.

She cohosted the 2021 International Emmy Awards. She also hosted the romantic comedy reality dating series My Mom, Your Dad, which premiered on HBO Max in 2022, which ran for a single season.

In 2023, Orji voiced Tess, the estranged wife of secret bounty hunter Terry, a recurring character in My Dad the Bounty Hunter.

Charitable efforts 
Outside of her creative work, she is dedicated to philanthropy. In 2008 and 2009 she spent six months working in post-conflict Liberia, with Population Services International (PSI), an NGO that utilizes social marketing in the adoption of healthy behaviors. While in Liberia, she worked with a group of talented youth to help build a mentoring program as well as a weekly talk show that helped educate and prevent the spread of teen pregnancy and HIV/AIDS. She currently lends her time and voice as a (RED) Ambassador, a Literacy Champion for Jumpstart, and working with JetBlue for Good.

Filmography

Awards and nominations

Further reading

References

External links

Yvonne Orji on Instagram

1983 births
21st-century African-American people
21st-century American actresses
21st-century American comedians
21st-century Christians
21st-century Nigerian actresses
Actresses from Maryland
Actresses from Port Harcourt
African-American actresses
African-American Christians
African-American female comedians
American beauty pageant contestants
American people of Igbo descent
American television actresses
American women comedians
Beauty pageant contestants from Rivers State
Christians from Maryland
Comedians from Maryland
Milken Institute School of Public Health alumni
Igbo actresses
Igbo beauty pageant contestants
Igbo comedians
Living people
Nigerian beauty pageant contestants
Nigerian Christians
Nigerian women comedians
Nigerian emigrants to the United States
Nigerian television actresses
People from Port Harcourt
People from Lititz, Pennsylvania
People from Laurel, Maryland
21st-century African-American women